Le Môle is a mountain of the Chablais Alps in the Haute-Savoie department of France which dominates the area around the town of Bonneville. The communes of Ayze, La Tour, Saint-Jean-de-Tholome, Marignier, Saint-Jeoire-en-Faucigny, Viuz-en-Sallaz, Peillonnex, and Faucigny encircle it. It rises to 1,863 metres and affords an excellent 360-degree view of the surrounding region.

Though a small mountain by Alpine standards, it is of great geographic importance as it divides the vallée de l'Arve to the south and the west from the vallée du Giffre to the north and southeast, and dominates the southern entrance to the Geneva basin. Mary Shelley, in her 1818 novel Frankenstein; or, The Modern Prometheus, quotes Le Môle as being seen by Victor Frankenstein from Geneva, where he was born and lived before being a student in Germany.

References

Mountains of Haute-Savoie
Mountains of the Alps